Humphrey Edwards  was a Welsh Anglican priest in the 16th century.

Edwards was educated at the University of Oxford. He held Livings at St Trillo, Llandrillo, Denbighshire and St Mary Woolnoth in the City of London. He was Archdeacon of St Asaph from 1554 to 1558.

References

Alumni of Trinity College, Cambridge
Archdeacons of St Asaph
16th-century Welsh Anglican priests